Mohamed Amine Ben Hamida (born 25 December 1995) is a Tunisian footballer who plays for Espérance de Tunis, as a left back.

Club career
His contract with Espérance de Tunis runs till 30 June 2024. In 2017, he was transferred from Espérance de Tunis to AS Soliman. AS Soliman received Mohamed Amine Ben Hamida from Espérance de Tunis on a free loan.

International career
He made his debut for the Tunisia national football team on 30 November 2021 in a 2021 FIFA Arab Cup game against Mauritania.

Style of play
Left is his favoured foot. Mohamed Amine Ben Hamida has also been deployed as a wing back and an inverted wing back.

References

External links
 

1995 births
Living people
Espérance Sportive de Tunis players
Association football defenders
Tunisian footballers
Tunisia international footballers
Olympique Béja players
2021 Africa Cup of Nations players